Serhat Tutumluer (born 29 June 1972) is a Turkish actor. His period series are Filinta, Vatanım Sensin, Alparslan: Büyük Selçuklu.
Other notably series are Hercai, "Sahra", "Ezo Gelin" from true story alongside Nurgül Yeşilçay, Umutsuz Ev Kadınları adaptation of Desperate of Housewifes.

Biography
Serhat Tutumluer began studying sociology at Istanbul University but later went to Ankara State Conservatory where he graduated in theatre. Between 1995 and 1997, he worked at the Ankara State Theatre. He won the Best Actor Award at the 27th Istanbul Film Festival for his performance in Ara. He won the best actor award at the 14th Sadri Alışık Cinema and Theater Awards for his performance in Devirim Arablari.

Filmography

Television

Film

Theatre
 Yastık Adam (Mehmet Ergen)
 Kız Tavlama Sanatı (Talimhane Theatre-Mehmet Ergen)
 Oyunun Oyunu (İstanbul BKM – Mehmet Ergen)
 Bir Sevda Türküsü (Ankara State Theatre – Ejder Akışık)
 Budala (Ankara State Theatre – Bozkurt Kuruç)
 Giordano Bruno (Ankara State Theatre – Erhan Gökgücü)
 Küçük Nasrettin – Kukla Oyunu (Ankara State Theatre – Soner Ağın)
 Aşk Delisi (Aksanat – Mehmet Ergen)
 Bir de Yolluk (Aksanat – Mehmet Ergen)
 Küller Küllere (Aksanat – Mehmet Ergen)
 Hamlet (İzmit City Theatre – Işıl Kasapoğlu)
 Sokağa Çıkma Yasağı (İzmit City Theatre – Cüneyt Çalışkur)
 Hakimiyet-i Milliye Aşevi (İzmit City Theatre – Cüneyt Türel)
 Nasrettin Hoca (İzmit City Theatre – Işıl Kasapoğlu and Melih Düzenli)
 Kuvayi Milliye Destanı – Kukla Oyunu (İzmit City Theatre – Melih Düzenli)
 Üç Kuruşluk Opera (İzmit City Theatre – M.Kith Kay)
 Karar Kimin (İzmit City Theatre – Şakir Gürzumar)
 İsli Sisli Pis Puslu (İzmit City Theatre – Yaşar Özveri and Yücel Ertan)
 Bahar Noktası (İzmit City Theatre – Yücel Ertan)
 Şahmeran Hikayesi – Gölge Kukla Oyunu (İzmit City Theatre – Ebru Kara Dehekli)
 Cimri (İzmit City Theatre)
 Yedi Cüceler ve Dev (Eskişehir – Children's Play)

References

External links
 
 

1972 births
Living people
People from Eskişehir
Turkish male film actors
Turkish male television actors
Turkish male stage actors